Lovedale, also known as the Lovedale Missionary Institute was a mission station and educational institute in the Victoria
East division of the Cape Province, South Africa (now in Eastern Cape Province).

Foundation 
The station was founded in 1824 by the Glasgow Missionary Society (GMS) and was named after Dr John Love, one of the leading members of, and at the time secretary to, the society. The site first chosen was in the Ncera valley, but in 1834 the mission buildings were destroyed during the 6th Frontier War. On rebuilding, the station was removed somewhat farther north to the banks of the Tyhume river. John Bennie was one of the founding fathers of the mission station, which was established among the Xhosas. In 1846 the work at Lovedale was again interrupted, this time by the War of the Axe. On this occasion the buildings were converted into a fort and garrisoned by regular troops. In 1850, the Xhosa government threatened Lovedale and made an attack on the neighbouring Fort Hare, built during the previous war.

Until 1841 the missionaries had devoted themselves almost entirely to evangelistic work; in that year the Lovedale Missionary Institute was founded by William Govan, who, save for brief intervals, continued at its head until 1870. He was then succeeded by Dr. James Stewart (1831-1905), who had joined the mission in 1867, having previously (1861-1863), and partly in company with David Livingstone, explored the Zambezi regions. Jane Elizabeth Waterston, a Scottish teacher, was given the job of creating a facility for girls at the mission. She arrived in South Africa in January 1867 to work for Dr James Stewart. The Lovedale Girls' Institution opened on 23 August 1868.

Denomination
Until 1837 the mother institution back in Scotland, the GMS, was not attached to any church. The crisis that would lead to the Disruption of 1843 began brewing in the 1830s, and in 1837 the GMS split in two--those who continued to support the Church of Scotland and those who disagreed with the Church's official policy, which allowed the church to appoint a pastor even against the wish of the congregation. Lovedale and some other missions went with the Church of Scotland, but others attached themselves to the Glasgow South African Missionary Society, which was associated with the Relief Church; after the 1843 disruption all of the stations allied with the Church of Scotland, including Lovedale, were transferred to the Free Church of Scotland.

Native education

The institute, in addition to its purely church work — in which no sectarian tests were allowed — provided for the education of Africans of both sexes in nearly all branches of learning (Stewart discontinued the teaching of Greek and Latin, adopting English as the classic); it also took European (white) scholars, no racial distinction being allowed in any department of the work (indeed; until it became part of the new Union of South Africa in 1910, the laws of the Cape Colony were "colour-blind"). The institute gave technical training in many subjects and maintained various industries, including such diverse enterprises as farming and printing-works. Eventually it included a primary school, high school, technical school, a teacher training college, a theological college and a hospital.

The school buildings rivalled in accommodation and completeness those of the schools in large British cities. The educational and industrial methods initiated at Lovedale were widely adopted by other missionary bodies.

Lovedale later became a branch of the work of the United Free Church of Scotland, becoming part of the Church of Scotland in 1929 (when the United Free Church united with the Church of Scotland). It was closed in the 1950s under the Bantu Education Act. The last ordained Principal of Lovedale was the Reverend R. H. W. Shepherd, who became Moderator of the General Assembly of the Church of Scotland in 1959.

Missionary control of the college at Lovedale ended in 1955, passing to the state through the Bantu Education Act of 1952. The Lovedale Bible School continued as a separate Christian institution. Lovedale Press, in Alice, continues to publish religious and educational material in several languages.

The Ciskei Government closed the college in 1979 but later re-opened it. The campus at Alice continues today with an emphasis on Agriculture.

Notable alumni 
David Cranmer Theko Bereng
Steve Biko
Chris Hani
William Wellington Gqoba
Ellen Kuzwayo
Z. K. Mathews
Samuel Edward Krune Mqhayi
Govan Mbeki
Gladys Mgudlandlu
Charles Nqakula
Sam Nolutshungu
Enoch Sontonga
King Sobhuza II
Tiyo Soga
Walter Stanford

Notable staff
Rev Dr James Stewart
George McCall Theal
Milner Langa Kabane, who later became principal
'Masechele Caroline Ntseliseng Khaketla
Rev David Duncan Stormont missionary here from 1891

Other 
Lovedale is also the name of a house on the island of Iona in Scotland. It is believed that a previous resident of the house had South African links, which explains the naming of the house in an area where Gaelic house names predominate.

Notes and references 

 The Gov'nor Observer Column in: The Financial Times, June 14, 2001)

External links 

Eastern Cape
Christian missions in South Africa